Myrsini can refer to the following places in Greece:

 Myrsini, Grevena, a village in Grevena regional unit
 Myrsini, a town in Elis 
 Myrsini, Laconia, a village in Laconia 
 Myrsini, Lasithi, a village in Lasithi
 Myrsini, Preveza and Kato Myrsini, two villages in Preveza regional unit
 Myrsini, Tinos, a village in the island of Tinos
 Myrsine, a woman in Greek mythology